Jonathan David "Jono" Hickey (born 30 March 1991) is a New Zealand sportsman who currently represents in cricket and rugby union, playing wicket-keeper and batsman for the Northern Districts and playing in the scrum-half position for the provincial based ITM Cup side Auckland. Hickey attended Saint Kentigern College and is the older brother of Blues first five-eighths Simon.

Cricket career
Hickey spent his formative cricketing years with Auckland's Cornwall Cricket Club before a move to Counties Manukau after being unsuccessful with making junior representative sides. He joined the Manukau Cricket Club as a 15-year-old and within a year he'd attracted the attention of the New Zealand under-19 selectors. As well as playing for and captaining the Counties Manukau under-17's and under-19's and the Northern District under-19s, Hickey made his premier club cricket debut and his first-class debut for Counties Manukau in 2008.

He then got his first taste of international cricket featuring in the New Zealand under-19 side with three friendlies against Pakistan in Blenheim. Hickey also represented the under-19 side in the 2010 ICC Under-19 Cricket World Cup hosted by New Zealand.

After being a New Zealand Under-19 graduate he switched provinces, moving south to represent Marlborough before leaving to Ireland in 2011 to feature in the Leinster Senior League and Irish Senior Cup for Pembroke. Hickey was then held back by a few injuries and missed opportunities in recent seasons to make his List A debut for the Northern Districts. He overcame that in style, coming into the Ford Trophy side with great zest and punching out vital half-centuries under pressure. Hickey eventually made his First-class debut with side against Auckland during the 2013–14 Plunket Shield season.

Rugby career

Hickey had played halfback for the Auckland rugby club Grammar TEC in the past two club seasons, his skill set, fitness and accurate goal kicking making him an obvious selection in the 2015 Auckland ITM Cup squad. Hickey has gone on to coach with Grammar Tec and schools around Auckland to promote rugby in Auckland
In 2019, Hickey signed with the Hurricanes and Wellington Rugby however was ruled out of the entire 2019 playing year with a major shoulder injury in a Super Rugby pre season match.

References

External links
 itsrugby.co.uk profile
 Jono Hickey at blackcaps.co.nz

1991 births
New Zealand rugby union players
Auckland rugby union players
Rugby union scrum-halves
Living people
New Zealand cricketers
Northern Districts cricketers
Rugby union players from Auckland